Bardmil (also Romanized as Bardmīl; also known as Bardmīl-e Yek) is a village in Susan-e Gharbi Rural District, Susan District, Izeh County, Khuzestan Province, Iran. At the 2006 census, its population was 493, in 71 families.

References 

Populated places in Izeh County